The 2020–21 season was Raith Rovers' first season back in the second tier of Scottish football after being promoted from Scottish League One at the premature end of the 2019–20 season. Raith Rovers also competed in the League Cup & the Scottish Cup.

Summary

Management

Raith were led by manager John McGlynn for the 2020–21 season for his 3rd season at the club.

Results & fixtures

Pre-season

Scottish Championship

Scottish Premiership play-offs

Scottish League Cup

Matches

Scottish Cup

Player statistics

Squad 
Last updated 15 May 2021

|}

Disciplinary record
Includes all competitive matches.

Last updated May 2021

Team statistics

League table

League Cup table

Management statistics
Last updated on 15 May 2021

Notes

References

Raith Rovers F.C. seasons
Raith Rovers